NGC 490, also occasionally referred to as PGC 4973 or GC 277, is a lenticular galaxy in the constellation Pisces. It is located approximately 85 million light-years from Earth and was discovered on December 6, 1850, by Irish engineer Bindon Blood Stoney. Although John Dreyer, creator of the New General Catalogue, credits the discovery to astronomer William Parsons, he notes that many of his claimed discoveries were made by one of his assistants. In the case of NGC 490, the discovery was made by Bindon Stoney, who discovered it along with NGC 486, NGC 492 and NGC 500 during his observation of NGC 488. 

The object was initially described in the New General Catalogue as "very faint, very small, round, 8 arcmin northeast of h 103 (=NGC 488)".

See also  
 Lenticular galaxy 
 List of NGC objects (1–1000)
 Pisces (constellation)

References

External links 
 
 
 SEDS

Lenticular galaxies
Pisces (constellation)
0490
4973
Astronomical objects discovered in 1850
Discoveries by Bindon Blood Stoney
Discoveries by William Parsons, 3rd Earl of Rosse